Diana-Maria Riva (born July 22, 1969) is an American actress, known for her performances on television. She was a regular cast member in series including Philly (2001-02), Side Order of Life (2007), The Good Guys (2010), Telenovela (2015-16) and Gordita Chronicles (2022). Riva also had major recurring roles in The West Wing, The Bridge and Dead to Me.

Early life
Diana-Maria Riva grew up in Cincinnati, Ohio, the daughter of Maria (née Riva) and Chris, a dentist. She attended St. Ursula Academy and the University of Cincinnati College-Conservatory of Music

Career
Riva began her career on stage appearing in Michael Weller play Help! in 1996. Also that year, she made her screen debut in the short-lived ABC comedy series, Common Law. The series was canceled after only four episodes. She later was cast in a recurring role in the ABC legal series, Murder One created by Steven Bochco. She later would appear on regular and recurring roles on his shows including NYPD Blue (1997, 1999), City of Angels (2000), and Philly (2001-02). Her other early television credits including Party of Five, The X Files, The Drew Carey Show, Everybody Loves Raymond, CSI, and Less Than Perfect. She has also appeared as a celebrity guest on the Donny Osmond version of the game show Pyramid.

In 2000, Riva made her big screen debut playing the supporting role in the romantic comedy film, What Women Want. She later appeared in films The Third Wheel (2002), Chasing Papi (2003), Our Family Wedding (2010), Short Term 12 (2012), Love & Mercy (2014), and McFarland, USA (2015). Riva had recurring roles in Sabrina The Teenage Witch (2002-03), The West Wing (2005-06), and Studio 60 on the Sunset Strip (2006-07). In 2007, she starred in the short-lived Lifetime drama series, Side Order of Life.  

In 2010, Riva starred as Lieutenant Ana Ruiz in the FOX police comedy series, The Good Guys as the boss of detectives Dan Stark (West Wing/Studio 60 alum Bradley Whitford) and Jack Bailey (Colin Hanks) in the Dallas Police Department. In 2012, she starred as a mother-in-law of Rob Schneider's title character in the short-lived CBS sitcom Rob!. From 2013 to 2015, she had a recurring role in the FX crime drama The Bridge, and from 2015 to 2016 starred alongside Eva Longoria in the NBC comedy series, Telenovela. The following year, she was regular cast member during the first season of CBS sitcom Man with a Plan as Mrs. Rodriguez. In 2019, she starred in the NBC sitcom Sunnyside opposite Kal Penn, and from 2019 to 2022 had a recurring role on the Netflix comedy-drama series, Dead to Me. In 2022, she starred in the another short-lived comedy series, Gordita Chronicles for HBO Max.

Filmography

Film

Television

References

External links
 
 AllMovie entry
 

1969 births
Living people
Actresses from Cincinnati
American film actresses
American people of Dominican Republic descent
American people of German descent
American television actresses
Hispanic and Latino American actresses
20th-century American actresses
21st-century American actresses